Challenger (stylized as CHALLENGER) is an extended play (EP) marketed as the third single of Japanese boy group JO1. Consisting of a total of six songs, the EP single was released by Lapone Entertainment into three different physical editions and one digital edition on April 28, 2021. It features the participation of various Japanese and South Korean songwriters and production teams such as Score, Megatone, Teito, Kebee,  and others. The single earned the top spot at the Oricon Singles Chart and received a Platinum certification by the Recording Industry Association of Japan with its lead track "Born to Be Wild" peaked atop the Billboard Japan Hot 100.

Background and release 
In early January 2021, JO1 reportedly arrived in South Korea to prepare for a new single. On February 20, JO1 held their second online concert titled Starlight Deluxe in Paju as a part of the promotion of their first studio album The Star. At the end of the concert, the group announced their third single was set to be released on April 28. After completing their journey to become or their "shining self" in the previous release, the concept of the single was said to be JO1 "stepping into the unknown world". The cover images were released on the group's first anniversary on March 4, along with the announcement of their first tour in winter. On April 28, the group held a live streaming event on YouTube to commemorate the release of the single which was then followed by the release of the performance video for track "Speed of Light". The performance video for track "Design" was released on May 5.

Challenger consists of a total of six songs that were released into three different physical editions with "Born to Be Wild" served as the lead track. It is their first release that doesn't consist of any re-released songs from Produce 101 Japan. Each type of the single consists of four tracks with three common tracks, which are "Born to be Wild", "Design" and "Tsutaerareru Nara". The latter was used the theme song for Kit Kat Japan's commercial and released digitally on January 18. The limited edition A comes with a DVD bundle consisting of a variety segment with the members called JO1 Challenge. The limited edition B and the normal edition come with a photo booklet and a CD-only, respectively. A special edition EP that includes all the songs was released for digital download and streaming.

Lead track and promotion 
"Born to be Wild" is mainly composed of bass lines and rhythms in retro funk style. The music video was directed by Seo Dong-hyeok from South Korean production company Flipevil, and released worldwide on March 24, 2021. The theme was said to be "challenge": opening the door boldly with fear and expectation, taking the first step, and overcoming with determination. The song was pre-released digitally along with "Tsutaerareru Nara" on March 25 and debuted at number eighty-eight before eventually peaked at number one on Billboard Japan Hot 100. "Born to Be Wild" was performed for the first time during the group's appearance at the KCON:TACT 3 on that same day. A short version of the song was also performed in the group's first terrestrial TV show Toresugi JO1 a day later. The song was subsequently performed in several TV shows even before the single was released, including Hey!Hey!Neo! Music Champ, CDTV Live Live, and NHK's variety talk show . "Born to Be Wild" was also used as the theme song for the nationwide TV commercial of Nike Air Max Infinity 2 by ABC-Mart.

Commercial performance 
Challenger debuted at number one on the Oricon Daily Singles Chart on its first day and eventually topped the weekly chart with 254,111 copies sold, earning JO1 an achievement as the twelfth overall group and the sixth male group in the history of Oricon charts to have first week sales of over 200,000 copies for three consecutive singles since its debut. The single received a Platinum certification by the Recording Industry Association of Japan for more than 250,000 copies in shipments. It then earned eleventh place on the mid-year edition of the chart, and ranked at twenty-second on the 2020 Oricon Annual Ranking with 309,606 copies sold.

Challenger also debuted atop of Billboard Japan Top Singles Sales, and put JO1 at second place for the Artist 100, which was also their highest placement on the chart to date. SoundScan and Billboard Japan reported the single had sold 348,000 copies as of July 4, and earned tenth place on their singles chart for the first half of 2021. Challenger eventually the single ranked twenty-third on the annual edition of Top Single Sales.

Track listing 
"Born to be Wild", "Design" and "Tsutaerareru Nara" are common track 1, 3 and 4, respectively, for limited edition A, limited edition B and normal edition.

Charts

Weekly charts

Monthly charts

Year-end charts

Certifications

Release history

References 

JO1 songs
2021 songs
2021 singles
Billboard Japan Hot 100 number-one singles
Japanese-language songs
Oricon Weekly number-one singles